Stade Municipal is a multi-use stadium in Yverdon-les-Bains, Switzerland. It is used mostly for football matches and is the home ground of Yverdon-Sport FC and has a capacity of 6,600. The stadium has 1,000 seats and 5,600 standing places.

It has 4 grass pitches equipped with floodlights as well as an illuminating training area.

References

External links 
Stade Municipal ASF/SFA omologation record. 

Yverdon-Sport FC
Municipal
Yverdon-les-Bains
Buildings and structures in the canton of Vaud